Joanne Aluka-White (born April 26, 1979 in Jackson, Mississippi, United States) is a Nigerian American women's basketball player.

Early life and education 
She was born in Mississippi in the United States and acquired Nigerian citizenship through her parents. She attended Hephzibah High School in the U.S. state of Georgia. She was a   graduate of Middle Tennessee State with a Bachelor’s degree in Behavioral Science in 2001 and went further to complete her Master’s degree in Human Performance with a concentration in Sports Management in 2003. She married Fred White and they have twins: Daniel and Gabrielle.

Career 
Aluka competed at the 2004 Summer Olympics in Athens Greece with the Nigeria women's national basketball team. After the Olympics, Aluka joined and played for a while in the Dallas Fury in the National Women’s Basketball League. Aluka experienced her first coaching job at FIU where her responsibilities included assisting with recruiting, on-floor game and practice coaching as well as promotions and camps. Before she went into coaching, she successfully built her career and played at Middle Tennessee State (1997-2002).

Achievement 

 Scoring over 1,000 career points 
 Earned Ohio Valley Conference Freshman of the Year honors during her four-year career
 Team captain that helped the Blue Raiders capture an Ohio Valley Tournament Championship and a bid to the NCAA Tournament during her career
 Played professionally in Portugal and helped her team to the National Cup Championship game in 2004

References

1979 births
Living people
American sportspeople of Nigerian descent
American women's basketball players
Basketball players at the 2004 Summer Olympics
Basketball players from Jackson, Mississippi
Middle Tennessee Blue Raiders women's basketball players
Nigerian women's basketball players
Olympic basketball players of Nigeria